Christos Mastrou (born January 3, 1988, in Cyprus) is a Cypriot football player, who plays as a goalkeeper who plays for Anagennisi Deryneia and the Cypriot National Team.

Anorthosis Famagusta F.C.
On June 13, 2012, Mastrou transferred from Anagennisi to Anorthosis Famagusta F.C. for 80,000 euros. He was successful so Anorthosis released him on 21/08/2013. From that date he played for Enosis Neon Paralimni

References

External links

1988 births
Living people
Cypriot footballers
Association football goalkeepers
Cyprus international footballers
Anagennisi Deryneia FC players
Anorthosis Famagusta F.C. players
Greek Cypriot people
People from Famagusta District